Netechma ochrotona is a species of moth of the family Tortricidae. It is found in Morona-Santiago Province, Ecuador.

References

External links

Moths described in 2003
Endemic fauna of Ecuador
Fauna of Ecuador
ochrotona
Moths of South America
Insects of South America